Jürgen Eschert (born 24 August 1941) is a retired German sprint canoeist. Competing in the C-1 1000 m event he who a gold medal at the 1964 Olympics and a bronze at the 1965 European Championships.

In 1971 Eschert was expelled from the East Germany national team for wearing in public a T-shirt featuring the U.S. flag. He was a member of German military at the time. He retired from competitions and later worked as a coach and sports organizer. Eschert holds a PhD in physical education.

References

1941 births
Canoeists at the 1964 Summer Olympics
German male canoeists
Living people
Olympic canoeists of the United Team of Germany
Olympic gold medalists for the United Team of Germany
Olympic medalists in canoeing
Medalists at the 1964 Summer Olympics
Sportspeople from Magdeburg